The 1920 All-Ireland Senior Football Championship was the 34th staging of Ireland's premier Gaelic football knock-out competition.

In the Leinster final Dublin ended Kildare's period as All Ireland champions.

The championship was disrupted by the ongoing Irish War of Independence, including the events of Bloody Sunday in November 1920, when British forces killed fourteen people at a match between Dublin and Tipperary at Croke Park in Dublin. Because Dublin and Tipperary were the eventual finalists, it is often incorrectly assumed that this was the All-Ireland final, but it was actually a challenge match held to raise funds for the Republican Prisoners Dependents Fund. In fact, Tipperary did not play their semi-final match until 1922, 19 months after Dublin won the first semi-final.

The Final was played in June 1922. Tipperary beat Dublin by 1-6 to 1-2.

100 years later, the same four teams appeared in the semi-finals, with Cavan also playing Dublin and Mayo also playing Tipperary, confirmed on the weekend of the centenary of Bloody Sunday with the championship delayed by the COVID-19 pandemic.

Provincial championships

Connacht Senior Football Championship

Leinster Senior Football Championship

Munster Senior Football Championship

Ulster Senior Football Championship

All-Ireland Senior Football Championship

Bracket

References